Tiziana Andina (born 10 February 1970) is the Theoretical Philosophy Professor at the University of Turin.

Biography
Tiziana Andina was born in Asti in 1970. Andina attended the University of Turin where she studied philosophy graduating in 1994. Andina completed her doctorate in aesthetics and the theory of the arts in 2003 from the University of Palermo. She went on to become a researcher and professor in the University of Turin. She teaches theoretical philosophy there.  Andina is the managing editor of the Rivista di Estetica, one of Italy's oldest journals. In 2016 she became the director of the LabOnt research center.

Sources

1970 births
Living people
People from Asti
Essayists